163 may refer to:

Dates
163 CE, a common year of the Julian calendar
163 BC, a year of the pre-Julian Roman calendar

Number
163 (number), the natural number following 162 and preceding 164

Other
163 (New Jersey bus)
Messerschmitt Me 163
U.S. Route 163, a 64-mile (103 km) U.S highway
California State Route 163, a state highway in San Diego, California
Virginia State Route 163, a primary state highway in the U.S. state of Virginia
163.com or NetEase